The ringed cross is a class of Christian cross symbols featuring a ring or nimbus. The concept exists in many variants and dates to early in the history of Christianity. One variant, the cruciform halo, is a special type of halo placed behind the head of Jesus in Christian art. Other common variants include the Celtic cross, used in the stone high crosses of Ireland and Britain; some forms of the Coptic cross; and ringed crosses from western France and Galicia.

History

The nimbus or ringed shape was appended to the Christian cross and other symbols relatively early. In these contexts it apparently derived from the earlier Roman garland of victory. The Chi Rho-in-circle motif was widespread in the Roman Empire by the late 4th century, and garlanded and ringed crosses were popular in imperial Ravenna by the 5th century, influencing the later versions. The cruciform halo or cross halo, a halo incorporating a cross, emerged as a distinctive type of halo painted behind the head of members of the Holy Trinity, especially Jesus, and occasionally others. In other cases, the combination of cross and nimbus symbolized the presence of Christ throughout the cosmos, with the nimbus representing the celestial sphere. Notable early examples include the cosmological ringed cross in the 5th-century Mausoleum of Galla Placidia, and the 6th-century Crux Gemmata in the Basilica of Sant'Apollinare in Classe.

Examples

Celtic cross

The Celtic cross is a variant of the ringed cross that emerged in Ireland and Britain in the Early Middle Ages. It is a Latin cross featuring a nimbus surrounding the intersection of the stem and arms. The Celtic cross became widespread through the distinctive stone high crosses erected across the islands beginning in the early 8th century; most, but not all, of these monuments take the form of the Celtic cross. Scholars debate the origins of the type, but it is related to earlier types of ringed crosses such as the "cosmological cross" used in Ravenna. St. John's Cross at Iona, an Irish monastery off the coast of Scotland and a major pilgrimage center, may be the prototype for all other high crosses. Most high crosses were made between the 8th and 10th centuries, with a briefer revival occurring in Ireland in the late 11th and 12th centuries.

The Celtic cross saw a resurgence in the mid-19th century, following new studies and reconstructions of the medieval high crosses. They subsequently became common objects in art, architecture, and merchandise during the Celtic Revival. They have since remained popular symbols of Ireland and "Celtic" identity.

Continental Europe

France 
A type of ringed cross, called the croix nimbée ("cross with nimbus") is found in France. Their design is different from the Celtic cross, but all the French examples are quite analogous in shape to each other.  They are found mainly in the western part of France: in Normandy, Limousin as far as Auvergne in the centre. Most of them were made around the 16th century. One can be seen on the spire of Orléans Cathedral, in the Loire valley.

In Lower Normandy, in Cotentin, many churches have kept their tombstones decorated with a cross.

Galicia 
A distinct form of ringed cross similar to Celtic variant is found in Galicia in Spain, often topping horreos (granaries) as a protective measure against any kind of evil. They can also be found atop churches and, since the beginning of the 20th century, in cemeteries, but they are unusual in cruceiros (high crosses). There is a very characteristic Galician Medieval style that combines a Celtic cross with a Celtic simple knot; it is similar to the St Maur cross at Glanfeuil Abbey.

Estonia 
E.g., in Saha cemetery around the chapel in North Estonia.

Coptic cross

Old Coptic crosses often incorporate a circle, as in the form called a "Coptic cross" by Rudolf Koch in his The Book of Signs (1933). Sometimes the arms of the cross extend through the circle (dividing it into four quadrants), as in the "Celtic cross". The circle cross was also used by the early Gnostic sects.

Nestorian cross

Crosses used by the Church of the East sometimes incorporate a circle, similar to the Celtic cross or a sun cross.

References

Crosses by form